On'yado Kawasemi or On-yado Kawasemi is a Japanese series of novels written by Yumie Hiraiwa and dramas and a play based on it. It is set in "Kawasemi" ("kingfisher" in Japanese), an inn in Ōkawabata, Edo (now Sumida, Tokyo). It was serialised in a magazine Shosetsu Sunday Mainichi from 1973 but was interrupted because of the discontinuance of the magazine. Later, it was serialised in All Yomimono from 1982 to 2005.

Plot 
At the end of Edo period, Shoji Rui hands over her birthright to her relatives with the death of her father and begins running an inn "Kawasemi" in Ōkawabata. And she settles the matters in their daily lives with her lover Kamibayashi Tōgo, doshin (a sort of constable) Une Genzaburō, physician Amanō Sotarō, and O-Kichi.

Characters

Main characters 
Kamibayashi Tōgo
Younger brother of Kamibayashi Michinoshin and instructor of kendo. He helps Une Genzaburō cracking a case and pries into the affairs occur around him or among those who visit and lodge at Kawasemi.
Shōji Rui
Landlady of Kawasemi who marries Tōgo later.
Une Genzaburō
Doshin for Minami-machi bugyō. A serious and sincere man and one of childhood friends of Tōgo.

People of Kawasemi 
Kasuke
Manager of Kawasemi.
O-Kichi
Head maid of Kawasemi who is very curious and likes chatting but has a phobia for ghost.

The Kamibayashi family 
Kamibayashi Michinoshin
Elder brother of Tōgo who is yoriki for Minami-machi bugyō.
Kanae
Wife of Michinoshin and the eldest daughter of Asō Genemon.

The Une family 
Chie
Wife of Genzaburō.
Gentarō
Son of Genzabutō.
Chiyo
Daughter of Genzaburō.

The Asō family 
Asō Genemon
Hatamoto who is the father of Kanae and Nanae. 
Asō Sōtarō (Amano Sotaro)
Physician who is a son of goten-i, a doctor employed by the shōgun and a son-in-law of Genemon. One of best friends of Tōgo.  
Nanae
Wife of Sōtarō, daughter of Genemon and younger sister of Kanae.

Other characters 
Chōsuke
Okappiki (a sort of private detective) for Une Genzaburō and owner of soba restaurant Chojuan though he leaves managing it up to his wife and son.
Sengorō
Another okappiki whose occupation is a cooper.
Matsuura Hōsai
Owner of Hōgetsukan, a kendo dojo in Mamiana  where Tōgo instructs kendo. He has a profound knowledge of swords.

List of novels

Bunshun bunko (pocketbooks published by Bungeishunjū)
 On'yado Kawasemi  
 Edo no komoriuta 
 Suigō kara kita onnna 
 Sazanka wa mita 
 Yūrei goroshi 
 Kitsune no yomeiri 
 Hōzuki wa koroshi no kuchibue 
 Shirahagi yashiki no tsuki 
 Ichiryō nibu no onnna
 Enma mairi
 Nijūrokuya machi no satsujin 
 Yogarasu O-Kin 
 Oni no men 
 Kami kakushi 
 Koibumi shinjū 
 Hacchōbori no yuya 
 Ugetsu 
 Hikyoku 
 Kakurenbo 
 O-Kichi no chawan 
 Inu hariko no nazo 
 Kiyohime O-Ryō 
 Gentarō no hatsukoi 
 Haru no takasebune 
 Takarabune matsuri 
 Chōsuke no nyōbō 
 Yokohama bojō 
 Sasuke no botan 
 Hatsuharu benzaisen 
 Kijo no hanatsumi 
 Edo no shōryō nagashi 
 Jyūsann sai no nakōdo 
 Koban shōnin 
 Ukare kichō

Hardcovers
 Haru no kyaku
 Shūgen
 Senju kannon no nazo

Adaptations

TV Series 

NHK adapted the series to TV series in 1980, 1982, 2003, 2004 and 2005.

Series 1 was broadcast from 8 October 1980 to 24 March 1981 and Series 2 was broadcast from 6 October 1982 and 13 April 1983 by NHK. And in 2013, both series and newly produced episodes starring Kyōko Maya and is set in Meiji era were broadcast by Jidaigeki Senmon Channel, describing Kawasemi and those who are related to the inn twenty years later. It was produced by NHK Enterprize and Jidaigeki Senmon Channel with the intention to keep the tradition of jidaigeki and it is the first case in which NHK Enterprize did not produce a programme for NHK.

In 1973, TBS adapted one of the novels "Aki no hotaru" ("Fireflys in Autumn") to drama.

TV Asahi also adapted it to two TV dramas and one TV series, starring Yūko Kotegawa and Yasuko Sawaguchi respectively.

Cast
NHK Series 1 and 2 (1980–1983)
Shōji Rui: Kyōko Maya
Kamibayashi Tōgo: Akira Onodera
Une Genzaburō: Takashi Yamaguchi  
Kamibayashi Michinoshin: Takahiro Tamura
Kanae: Momoko Kōchi
Kasuke: Tokue Hanazawa
O-Kichi: Mieko Yūki
Asō Genemon: Masami Shimojō
Nanae: Naomi Hase (Season 1), Yoshie Taira (Season 2)
Chōsuke: Kon Omura (Season 1)
Sengorō: Morihiko Uchiyama (Season 2)
Matsuura Hōsai: Seiji Miyaguchi (Season 1), Tōru Abe (Season 2)

NHK Series 3–5 (2003–2005)
Shōji Rui: Reiko Takashima
Kamihayashi Tōgo: Hashinosuke Nakamura 
Une Genzaburō: Kai Shishido (Series 3 and 4), Kazuki Sawamura (Series 5) 
Kasuke: Takehiko Ono 
O-Kichi: Machiko Washio
Chosuke: Kimihiro Reizei (Series3), Jirō Keisetsu (Series 4 and 5)
Matsuurra Hōsai: Yū Fujiki(Series 3), Gorō Ibuki (Series 4), Shigeru Koyama (Series 5)
Amano (Later Asō) Sōtarō: Kazumasa Suzuki (Series 4 and 5)
Amano Sōhaku: Masane Tsukayama (Series 5 only)
Asō Genemon: Hisashi Igawa
Nanae: Takami Yoshimoto
Kamihayashi Kanae: Akiko Nishina
Kamihayashi Michinoshin: Masao Kusakari

Shin On'yado Kawasemi (2013 version, broadcast by Jidaigeki Senmon Channel)
Shōji Rui: Kyōko Maya
Kamibayashi Tōgo: Akira Onodera
Une Genzaburō: Takashi Yamaguchi  
Kanae: Keiko Kishi
Kasuke: Takashi Sasano
O-Kichi: Mieko Yūki
Chōsuke: Mansaku Fuwa
Kamibayashi Asatarō: Dai Watanabe
Une Gentarō: Satoshi Matsuda

Aki no hotaru
Shoji Rui: Ayako Wakao
Kamihayashi Tōgo: Noboru Nakaya
Une Genzaburo: Katsuhiko Kobayashi
O-Kichi: Tsugiyo Ōjika

TV Asahi dramas (1988 and 1989)
Shōji Rui: Yūko Kotegawa
Kamihayashi Tōgo: Jun Hashizume
Une Genzaburō: Kōichi Miura

TV Asahi Series 1 (1997–1998)
Shōji Rui: Yasuko Sawaguchi
Kamihayashi Tōgo: Hiroaki Murakami
Une Genzaburō: Mitsuru Hirata
Kasuke: Takashi Sasano
O-Kichi: Yumiko Fujita
Chōsuke: Saburō Ishikura
Asō Genemon: Junkichi Orimoto
Nanae: Hijiri Kojima
Kanae: Haruka Sugata
Kamihayashi Michinoshin: Masahiko Tsugawa

Play 
It was adapted to a play and Yuko Hama played the role of Rui at the Imperial Theatre in 1984.

Comic 
From 2012 to 2013, it was adapted to manga by Yuzuru Shimazaki and was published serially in a magazine "Comic Ran Twins". It was published as two volumes of books by Leed Publishing co, Ltd. in November 2012 and May 2013.

Episodes

NHK Series(1980-1981)

References

External links 
Shin on-yado Kawasemi (TV Series 1997– ) - IMDb

Japanese serial novels
Novels set in hotels
Jidaigeki television series
1970s Japanese television series
1980s Japanese television series
1990s Japanese television series
2000s Japanese television series
NHK original programming
TV Asahi original programming
TBS Television (Japan) original programming
Japanese plays